Lázaro Medina (born October 22, 1922), sometimes listed as "Leonardo", is a Cuban former Negro league pitcher who played in the 1940s.

A native of Quivicán, Cuba, Medina made his Negro leagues debut in 1944 with the Indianapolis–Cincinnati Clowns, and played with the club again the following season. He went on to play in the Mexican League in the late 1940s, and also played for the Drummondville Cubs in 1949.

References

External links
 and Seamheads

1922 births
Possibly living people
Indianapolis Clowns players
Baseball pitchers
Cuban baseball players
People from Quivicán
Alijadores de Tampico players
Tuneros de San Luis Potosí players
Industriales de Monterrey players
Diablos Rojos del México players
Drummondville Cubs players
Cuban expatriate baseball players in Mexico
Cuban expatriates in the United States
Cuban expatriates in Mexico